
Loysel is a French surname. Notable people with the surname include:

Jean Avis Loysel, French doctor of the 15th and 16th century
Jacques Loysel, known under the name of Père Avis, French religious and preacher
Antoine Loysel (1536–1617), French jurisconsult who remained famous among jurists for having collected the general principles of old French customary law
Pierre Loysel (1751–1813), French politician
Julien-Jean-François Loysel (1751–1829), French magistrate and politician
Charles Loysel (1825–1889), French general and politician
Jacques Loysel (1867–1925), French sculptor
Maria Loysel (1882–1965), writer, author of many children's novels
Jean Loysel (1889–1962), French composer and lyricist

See also

 Loiselle (surname) – pronounced the same

References 
 This article was translated from the equivalent article in French Wikipedia. Retrieved 25 August 2020.

French-language surnames